OX40L is the ligand for OX40 (also known as CD134 or TNFRSF4) and is stably expressed on many antigen-presenting cells such as DC2s (a subtype of dendritic cells), macrophages, and activated B lymphocytes. 

The OX40 molecule, conversely, is present on the surface of activated T lymphocytes (mainly CD4+ T cells), but also on NK cells, NKT cells, and neutrophils. The ligation of OX40-OX40L is a source of survival signal for T cells and enables the development of memory T cells. Signaling through these two molecules also leads to polarization towards Th2 immune response even in an environment with low levels of IL-4 cytokine.

OX40L is also present on the surface of many non-immune cells, for example, endothelial cells and smooth muscle cells.

The surface expression of OX40L is induced by many pro-inflammatory mediators, such as TNF-α, e.g. produced by mast cells, IFN-γ and PGE2 (prostaglandin E2).

OX40L has also been designated CD252 (cluster of differentiation 252).

Various single-nucleotide polymorphisms (SNPs) of the OX40L gene have been identified. For some of them association with systemic lupus erythematosus has been reported. No association with occurrence of atherosclerosis has been found.

References

External links 
 
 

Clusters of differentiation